This is a list of Genoese towers in Corsica, a series of coastal defense towers constructed by the Republic of Genoa between 1530 and 1620 to defend against attacks by Barbary pirates.

References

Sources

Towers in Corsica
Corsica-related lists